The Province of Treviso is a province in the Veneto region of Italy. Its capital is the city of Treviso. The province is surrounded by Belluno in the north, Vicenza in the west, Padua in southwest, Venice in the southeast and Friuli-Venezia Giulia in the east. The river Piave passes through the province while the rivers Sile and Cagnan pass through the capital. The province's nickname is La Marca Trevigiana. It has a prosperous economy and is an important producer of wine. It encompasses an area of 750 square miles.

The province of Treviso was established by the Celts but flourished under Romans before it was subjugated to Hun, Ostrogoth, and Lombard control. During Roman rule, the province was called Tarvisium. During the first World War the province was badly damaged by the Army of Austria.

The province has a total population of about 900,000 . There are 95 municipalities in the province. The Marathon of Saint Anthony is a popular happening in the province's city Vedelago. It is an annual event organised on the last Sunday of April. The race starts from the city and ends in Padua. On their way the runners pass through eight different towns. Furniture, sport systems, textile, wine, shoes and machinery are some of the major commercial products in the province.

Montello Peak is located in the province. The plateau of Cansiglio was given the name-Woods of the Most Serene Republic because it supplied wood for making many Venetian ships.

Main sights 
Sights in Treviso include the Piazza dei Signori and the  Palazzo dei Trecento.

Barchessa di Villa Pola Pomini, Ca’ Corner della Regina and Villa Emo are located near Vedelago. Churches include the Cathedral of Castelfranco Veneto. The Rotonda  in Badoere is also another tourist attraction. Northern Marca, Conegliano and Valdobbiadene are well known for their vineyards. Due to the presence of varying landscapes, Asolo is called "the city of a hundred landscapes."

Municipalities

(as of 30 September 2010)

References

Sources
 
 
 
 
 

 
Treviso